Alexander Zverev was the defending champion, but chose not to defend his title.

Nikoloz Basilashvili won the title after defeating Jan-Lennard Struff 6–4, 7–6(7–3) in the final.

Seeds

Draw

Finals

Top half

Bottom half

References
 Main Draw
 Qualifying Draw

Heilbronner Neckarcup - Singles
2016 Singles